Max Schönwetter  (1874–1961) was a German ornithologist.

Max Schönwetter was primarily interested in oology. In 1960 the first part of his monumental Handbuch der Oologie Akademie-Verlag, Berlin, Germany was published. After his death, in the same year his work was carried on by Wilhelm Meise. The 47 parts published between 1960 and 1992 details and provides photographs of the eggs of all species and subspecies whose eggs are known (about half the known species, the eggs of the other half are unknown). Much of the work is based on specimens in the Ragnar Kreuger collection. The Max Schönwetter collection of  20,000 eggs from almost 4,000 bird species of birds is in the zoological collections of the University of Halle-Wittenberg.

References
Lantermann, W.: Erinnerung an Max Schönwetter (1874–1961), dem Nestor der wissenschaftlichen Eierkunde.
Naturkundemuseum Universität Halle

German ornithologists
1961 deaths
1874 births